Lars Anders Isovaara (born 23 January 1959 in Vittangi, Norrbotten County) is a Swedish civil engineer and former politician of the nationalist Sweden Democrats. He lives in Skellefteå, Sweden.

Isovaara was district chairman of the Sweden Democrats district North, covering Norrbotten County and Västerbotten County. He was also a member of the partys executive board and was criminal policy spokesperson until 2012. Isovaara became the first wheelchair user in the Riksdag. and assumed office in 2010. He left the Riksdag on 29 November 2012 after an incident where he was drunk and first accused two people of foreign origin of stealing his bag and then verbally abused a guard, who also has a foreign background. The bag, however, had been left at a restaurant and had been submitted to the Riksdag Security Unit.

He served as a member of the parliamentary Committee on Industry and Trade (Näringsutskottet) until his resignation.

References 

1959 births
Living people
Members of the Riksdag from the Sweden Democrats
People from Kiruna Municipality